Soun may refer to:

 Hōjō Sōun, Japanese samurai
 Soun Tendo, Ranma ½ character
 Soun Veasna (born 1994), Cambodian football player